Cauchas cockerelli is a moth of the family Adelidae or fairy longhorn moths. The species was recorded by August Busck in 1915. It is generally found in North America, including Colorado.

References

Adelidae
Moths described in 1915
Moths of North America